Miguel Angel Martínez Irala (born 29 September 1998) is a Paraguay international footballer who plays for Cerro Porteño, as a goalkeeper.

Career
Martínez made his debut and played only for General Diaz.

International
Martínez was called up to the Paraguay squad for the first time in October 2019.

References

External links
 

1998 births
Living people
Paraguayan footballers
General Díaz footballers
Paraguay international footballers
Association football goalkeepers
Sportspeople from Luque